Şenova is a village in the Kovancılar District of Elazığ Province in Turkey. Its population is 379 (2021). The village is populated by Kurds with some Muhacir families.

References

Villages in Kovancılar District
Kurdish settlements in Elazığ Province